Suljić is a Bosniak surname. Notable people with the surname include:

Ali Suljić (born 1997), Swedish footballer of Bosnian descent
Amir Suljić (born 1989), Bosnian-born Swedish footballer
Asmir Suljić (born 1991), Bosnian footballer
Ćazim Suljić (born 1996), French-born Bosnian footballer
Sunny Suljic (born 2005), American child actor and skateboarder

Bosnian surnames
Slavic-language surnames
Patronymic surnames